Valentin Ivanovich Khaustov (1884, Ryazan Governorate — after 1922) was a Russian turner, a menshevik and a deputy of the Fourth Imperial Duma from the Ufa Governorate between 1912 and 1917. He was also a member of the All-Russian Central Executive Committee (VTsIK). In 1917 he became a member of the Provisional Committee of the State Duma and the executive committee of the Petrograd Soviet - he was appointed a commissar for postal and telegraph employees. In 1918, after the beginning of the Russian Civil War, he supported the Committee of Members of the Constituent Assembly.

Literature 
 Николаев А. Б. Хаустов Валентин Иванович (in Russian) // Государственная дума Российской империи: 1906—1917 / Б. Ю. Иванов, А. А. Комзолова, И. С. Ряховская. — Москва: РОССПЭН, 2008. — P. 657. — 735 p. — .
 Хаустов (in Russian) // Члены Государственной думы (портреты и биографии): Четвертый созыв, 1912—1917 г. / сост. М. М. Боиович. — Москва: Тип. Т-ва И. Д. Сытина, 1913. — P. 362. — LXIV, 454, [2] p. 
 Мордвинцев Г. В. Уфимский рабочий депутат IV Государственной думы социал-демократ В. И. Хаустов и его протест против Первой мировой войны // Вестник ВЭГУ. — Уфа, 2014. — 7—8 (№ 4 (72)). — P. 119—131. — ISSN 1998-0078. (in Russian)

1884 births
Date of death missing
People from Ryazan Governorate
Russian Social Democratic Labour Party members
Mensheviks
Members of the 4th State Duma of the Russian Empire
All-Russian Central Executive Committee members